Alares, in antiquity, are supposed by some authors to have been a kind of militia or soldiery among the Romans, so called from ala, a wing, because of their lightness and swiftness in combat.

Others make them a people of Pannonia. Yet others, with more probability, take Alares for an adjective or epithet, and apply it to the Roman cavalry, because they were placed in the two wings, or alæ of the army.

References

Types of auxiliary unit in the army of ancient Rome
Types of cavalry unit in the army of ancient Rome